Andrena fucata  is a Palearctic species of mining bee.

References

External links
Images representing Andrena fucata

Hymenoptera of Europe
fucata
Insects described in 1802